Qaleh Kohneh (also Romanized as Qal‘eh Kohneh and Qal‘eh-ye Kohneh; also known as Kūhneh and Qal‘eh Kuhneh) is a village in Riz Rural District, Riz District, Jam County, Bushehr Province, Iran. At the 2006 census, its population was 336, in 78 families.

References 

Populated places in Jam County